{{DISPLAYTITLE:C20H21N3O}}
The molecular formula C20H21N3O (molar mass: 319.40 g/mol, exact mass: 319.1685 u) may refer to:

 Cilansetron
 Imidafenacin

Molecular formulas